Magnetic topological insulators are three dimensional magnetic materials with a non-trivial topological index protected by a symmetry other than time-reversal. In contrast with a non-magnetic topological insulator, a magnetic topological insulator can have naturally gapped surface states as long as the quantizing symmetry is broken at the surface. These gapped surfaces exhibit a topologically protected half-quantized surface anomalous Hall conductivity perpendicular to the surface. The sign of the half-quantized surface anomalous Hall conductivity depends on the specific surface termination.

Theory

Axion coupling 
The  classification of a 3D crystalline topological insulator can be understood in terms of the axion coupling . A scalar quantity that is determined from the ground state wavefunction

  .

where   is a shorthand notation for the Berry connection matrix
,

where  is the cell-periodic part of the ground state Bloch wavefunction.

The topological nature of the axion coupling is evident if one considers gauge transformations. In this condensed matter setting a gauge transformation is a unitary transformation between states at the same  point
.

Now a gauge transformation will cause  , . Since a gauge choice is arbitrary, this property tells us that  is only well defined in an interval of length  e.g. .

 Fractional lattice translations , n-fold rotations : .
 Time-reversal , inversion : .
The consequence is that if time-reversal or inversion are symmetries of the crystal we need to have 
Furthermore, we can combine inversion or time-reversal with other symmetries that do not affect  to acquire new symmetries that quantize . For example, mirror symmetry can always be expressed as  giving rise to crystalline topological insulators, while the first intrinsic magnetic topological insulator MnBiTe has the quantizing symmetry .

Surface anomalous hall conductivity 
So far we have discussed the mathematical properties of the axion coupling. Physically, a non-trivial axion coupling will result in a half-quantized surface anomalous Hall conductivity if the surface states are gapped. To see this, note that in general  has two contribution. One comes from the axion coupling , a quantity that is determined from bulk considerations as we have seen, while the other is the Berry phase  of the surface states at the Fermi level and therefore depends on the surface. In summary for a given surface termination the perpendicular component of the surface anomalous Hall conductivity to the surface will be
.

To see this, consider a block of a material with some initial  which we wrap with a 2D quantum anomalous Hall insulator with Chern index . As long as we do this without closing the surface gap, we are able to increase  by  without altering the bulk, and therefore without altering the axion coupling .

One of the most dramatic effects occurs when  and time-reversal symmetry is present, i.e. non-magnetic topological insulator. This forces  on every surface resulting in a Dirac cone (or more generally an odd number of Dirac cones) on every surface and therefore making the boundary of the material conducting.

On the other hand, if time-reversal symmetry is absent, other symmetries can quantize  and but not force  to vanish. The most extreme case is the case of inversion symmetry (I). Inversion is never a surface symmetry and therefore a non-zero  is valid. In the case that a surface is gapped, we have  which results in a half-quantized surface AHC .

A half quantized surface Hall conductivity and a related treatment is also valid to understand topological insulators in magnetic field  giving an effective axion description of the electrodynamics of these materials.  This term leads to several interesting predictions including a quantized magnetoelectric effect. Evidence for this effect has recently been given in THz spectroscopy experiments performed at the Johns Hopkins University.

Experimental realizations

References 

Condensed matter physics
Magnetism